Thomas Hunter (born June 7, 1988) is an American professional soccer player who plays as a goalkeeper for the Atlanta Silverbacks in the North American Soccer League.

Career

Early career
Born in Charlotte, North Carolina, Hunter started his youth career attending various camps in England, Denmark, Sweden, and the United States. He then joined the Wofford College Terriers in 2006. He played there till 2009. After college Hunter joined National Premier Soccer League side Chattanooga FC where he played for four seasons. While with Chattanooga, Hunter was named to the 2011 NPSL All-Star Team and led his team to the NPSL finals in 2012.

Atlanta Silverbacks
On May 1, 2014, after an injury to Derby Carrillo, it was announced that Hunter had signed for the Atlanta Silverbacks of the North American Soccer League. He made his professional debut for the side on June 7, 2014 against Indy Eleven. Hunter came on as a 32nd-minute substitute for Eric Ati and conceded two penalties as the game ended in a 3–3 draw.

Career statistics

References

External links 
 Atlanta Silverbacks Profile.

1988 births
Living people
American soccer players
Atlanta Silverbacks players
Association football goalkeepers
Soccer players from Charlotte, North Carolina
North American Soccer League players
Chattanooga FC players